Barbara Fusar-Poli (born 6 February 1972) is an Italian ice dancing coach and former competitor. With partner Maurizio Margaglio, she is the 2001 World champion, 2001 European champion, and 2002 Olympic bronze medalist. They won nine Italian titles and competed at three Olympics.

Career
Early in her career, Fusar-Poli competed with Matteo Bonfa and then Alberto Reani. After Reani retired, she asked Maurizio Margaglio to skate with her. She and Margaglio began skating on the senior level in 1994-95, and enjoyed some success in the first years of their career, including winning several Grand Prix medals. In 1999-2000, they won their first medals at the European and World Championships, finishing in second place at both events.

The following season was very successful for the duo, who won every event they entered and became the first Italians to win a World title in any discipline. They were not as successful in 2001-02, dropping to second at the Europeans and finishing third at the 2002 Winter Olympics. Their medal at the Olympics was not without some controversy, after Margaglio fell during the free dance portion. The result was protested by the Lithuanian team, who had finished fifth, but the protest was denied. Fusar-Poli/Margaglio did not compete at the 2002 World Championships and would not return to eligible skating until the 2005-06 season.

With the 2006 Winter Olympics being held in Turin, Fusar-Poli/Margaglio decided to return and compete in their home country. They did not skate in any international events prior to the Olympics, but did win the Italian National Championships. The Olympics were their first international event under the new scoring system adopted by the ISU, but, Fusar-Poli/Margaglio nonetheless held a narrow lead after the compulsory dance portion of the event, ahead of two-time world champions Tatiana Navka / Roman Kostomarov. This result was described in some news stories at the time as "shocking". In the original dance, Fusar-Poli/Margaglio were performing a rotational lift with only seconds left in their program when Margaglio lost his balance, dropped Fusar-Poli, and fell to the ice himself. Following this conclusion to the program, Fusar-Poli stood glaring at her partner for approximately thirty seconds before the couple took their bows and left the ice. They dropped to seventh overall, but moved up to sixth place after a clean free dance, and told the media that the incident at the end of the original dance had reflected their anger at the mistake rather than at each other. Several years later, Fusar-Poli said that there were Swarovski crystals on the ice from the costumes of earlier competitors, but that the fall was a result of their own mistake and not the ice conditions. The Olympics were Fusar-Poli/Margaglio's final competitive event together, but they continued to perform in shows.

Fusar-Poli has coached Charlene Guignard / Marco Fabbri, Tanja Kolbe / Stefano Caruso, and junior ice dancers. She is based mainly in Milan at the Agorà ice rink. In 2012, she started to collaborate with Igor Shpilband in Novi, Michigan. After Caruso ended his competitive career in 2014, he and Fusar-Poli began a coaching partnership.

Fusar-Poli has also worked as a reporter for Italian TV and Eurosport coverage of skating events.

Personal life 
Fusar-Poli was born on 6 February 1972 in Sesto San Giovanni, Italy. She married her long-time boyfriend, Olympic short track competitor Diego Cattani, in June 2000. Their daughter, Giorgia, was born in 2004, and their son, Christian, four years later.

Programs 
With Margaglio

Results 
GP: Champions Series / Grand Prix

With Margaglio

With Reani

With Bonfa

References

External links

 
 
 
 
 
 

1972 births
Living people
People from Sesto San Giovanni
Italian female ice dancers
Olympic figure skaters of Italy
Figure skaters at the 1998 Winter Olympics
Figure skaters at the 2002 Winter Olympics
Figure skaters at the 2006 Winter Olympics
Olympic bronze medalists for Italy
Olympic medalists in figure skating
World Figure Skating Championships medalists
European Figure Skating Championships medalists
Medalists at the 2002 Winter Olympics
21st-century Italian dancers
20th-century Italian dancers
20th-century Italian women
21st-century Italian women
Sportspeople from the Metropolitan City of Milan